Cartlidge is a surname. Notable people with the surname include:

 Arthur Cartlidge, English footballer
 David Cartlidge, English footballer
 James Cartlidge, English politician
 Katrin Cartlidge (1961–2002), English actress
 Katrin Cartlidge Foundation
 Michelle Cartlidge, English writer and illustrator
 William P. Cartlidge (born 1942), English film producer

People with the surname Cartlich, an archaic and variant spelling of Cartlidge:

 Elizabeth Caslon née Cartlich, British typefounder
 John Cartlich, 19th century equestrian performer
 Serena Cartlich, fictional character from the 1932 film Big City Blues

See also
 Cartledge
 Cartridge
 For members of the fictional 'Cartlege' family, see the Springhill TV series.